Oh, That Nastya! is a 1971 Soviet family film directed by Yuri Pobedonostsev.

Plot 
The film tells about a schoolgirl Nastya, who constantly invents and tells something, as a result of which she quarrels with a teacher, classmates and sister.

Cast 
 Irina Volkova as Nastya  (Anastasia)
 Tatyana Nevskaya as Lyuba Sitnikova  
 Sergei Kuskov as Edik Syroyegin 
 Natalya Gvozdikova as Sveta Ryabinina  
 Aleksandr Kharitonov as Sasha Zharikov  
 Svetlana Kotikova as Maryana Borisovna
 Nina Arkhipova as Ryabinina
 Natalia Yegorova as Olya
 Sasha Avayev as Sasha Avayev
 Yelena Gabrielova as gymnastics coach
 Sergei Prokhanov as counselor

References

External links 
 

1971 films
1970s Russian-language films
Gorky Film Studio films
Soviet black-and-white films
Films with live action and animation
Russian children's films
Soviet children's films